Douglas Michael Head (April 14, 1930 – February 2, 2011) was an American lawyer and politician who served as the 25th Attorney General of Minnesota. As of 2023, Head remains the most recent Republican to have held the office.

Early life and education
Born in Minneapolis, Minnesota, Head graduated with a Bachelor of Arts from Yale University and an LL.B. from the University of Minnesota Law School, where he graduated in 1956 along with classmate and also future Attorney General Walter Mondale.

Career
Passing the bar in 1957, he was elected to the Minnesota House of Representatives and served from 1961 to 1964. He was elected Attorney General in 1966 and assumed office on January 2, 1967, serving until January 4, 1971. To date, he is the last Republican elected Attorney General of Minnesota.

Head was an unsuccessful candidate for Governor of Minnesota in the 1970 election, losing to the DFL nominee, Wendell Anderson. In 1971, along with former Minnesota Solicitor General Jerome D. Truhn, he co-founded the law firm of Head & Truhn (now Head, Seifert & Vander Weide).

Head died on February 2, 2011, from natural causes at his home in Minneapolis. He was 80 years old.

References

External links
Douglas M. Head entry at The Political Graveyard
Minneapolis Star-Tribune – February 3, 2011: "Doug Head's lasting imprint"
Private Practice Lawyer Profile for Douglas M. Head, LexisNexis Martindale-Hubbell
Law Firm Overview for Head, Seifert & Vander Weide, LexisNexis Martindale-Hubbell

1930 births
2011 deaths
Minnesota Attorneys General
Republican Party members of the Minnesota House of Representatives
University of Minnesota Law School alumni
Yale University alumni
Businesspeople from Minneapolis
Politicians from Minneapolis
Lawyers from Minneapolis
20th-century American businesspeople
20th-century American lawyers